Vedat Albayrak (born Vano Revazishvili on 2 March 1993) is a Turkish judoka, born in Kokshetau, Kazakhstan. At the 2016 Summer Olympics he represented Greece under the name Roman Moustopoulos. He was eliminated in the second round of the men's 81 kg event by Juan Diego Turcios.

He won the bronze medal at the 2018 World Judo Championships held in Baku, Azerbaijan. He took the gold medal at the 2021 European Judo Championships in Lisbon, Portugal.

He won the silver medal in his event at the 2022 Judo Grand Slam Tel Aviv held in Tel Aviv, Israel.

References

External links

 
 
 
 

1993 births
Living people
Sportspeople from Kokshetau
Greek male judoka
Turkish male judoka
Judoka at the 2016 Summer Olympics
Olympic judoka of Greece
European Games competitors for Greece
European Games competitors for Turkey
Judoka at the 2015 European Games
Judoka at the 2019 European Games
Competitors at the 2018 Mediterranean Games
Competitors at the 2022 Mediterranean Games
Mediterranean Games gold medalists for Turkey
Mediterranean Games medalists in judo
Judoka at the 2020 Summer Olympics
Olympic judoka of Turkey
Islamic Solidarity Games medalists in judo
Islamic Solidarity Games competitors for Turkey